Juvenal Olmos (born October 4, 1962) is a Chilean football manager who is current manager of Mexican club Veracruz.

Olmos was born in Santiago de Chile.  His management of the Chile national team was unsuccessful, as they failed to get past the first round in Copa América 2004 and he was later fired, five games before the end of the qualifying round for the 2006 FIFA World Cup.

Honours

Player
Universidad Católica
 Primera División de Chile:1984,1987Copa Interamericana:1994Copa Chile: 1983, Copa República 1983,1995

Manager
Unión Española
 Primera B: 1999
Universidad Católica
 Primera División de Chile: Apertura 2002

External links
 

1962 births
Living people
Footballers from Santiago
Sportspeople from Santiago
Chilean footballers
Chilean expatriate footballers
Chile international footballers
Club Deportivo Universidad Católica footballers
K.S.V. Waregem players
Irapuato F.C. footballers
C.D. Antofagasta footballers
O'Higgins F.C. footballers
Chilean Primera División players
Belgian Pro League players
Liga MX players
Footballers at the 1984 Summer Olympics
Olympic footballers of Chile
1989 Copa América players
Expatriate footballers in Belgium
Chilean expatriate sportspeople in Belgium
Expatriate footballers in Mexico
Chilean expatriate sportspeople in Mexico
Chilean football managers
Unión Española managers
Club Deportivo Universidad Católica managers
Chile national football team managers
Newell's Old Boys managers
Everton de Viña del Mar managers
C.D. Veracruz managers
Chilean Primera División managers
Argentine Primera División managers
Liga MX managers
Chilean expatriate football managers
Expatriate football managers in Argentina
Chilean expatriate sportspeople in Argentina
Expatriate football managers in Mexico
2004 Copa América managers
Association football midfielders
Canal del Fútbol color commentators
Chilean association football commentators
National Renewal (Chile) politicians